Rhodotorula is a genus of pigmented yeasts, part of the division Basidiomycota. It is readily identifiable by distinctive orange/red colonies when grown on Sabouraud's dextrose agar (SDA).  This distinctive color is the result of pigments that the yeast creates to block out certain wavelengths of light (620–750 nm) that would otherwise be damaging to the cell.

Habitat
Rhodotorula is a common environmental inhabitant.  It can be cultured from soil, water, milk, fruit juice, and air samples. It is able to scavenge nitrogenous compounds from its environment remarkably well, growing even in air that has been carefully cleaned of any fixed nitrogen contaminants. In such conditions, the nitrogen content of the dry weight of Rhodotorula can drop as low as 1%, compared to around 14% for most bacteria growing in normal conditions.

Pathology
Only Rhodotorula mucilaginosa, R. glutinis, and R. minuta have been known to cause disease in humans. There were no reported cases of Rhodotorula infections before 1985. There were however forty-three reported cases of Rhodotorula bloodstream infections (BSIs) between 1960 and 2000. Rhodotorula is most commonly found in patients who are immunosuppressed and/or are using foreign-body technology such as central venous catheters. Rhodotorula is commonly treated by removing the catheter and the use of anti-fungals. Rhodotorula is susceptible to amphotericin B and flucytosine.

Rhodotorula can also cause infections in animals. There have been reports of skin infections in chickens and sea animals and lung infections and otitis in sheep and cattle.

Potential in bioremediation

One area in which Rhodotorula species may become of importance is in bioremediation, especially of contaminated water sites. As with bacteria, fungi can naturally develop modified metabolism to deal with environmental contaminants, and could then be used in bioremediation. One main target is often polycyclic aromatic hydrocarbons (PAHs) since they often persist in the environment and have high levels of toxicity. Through sediment analysis and testing of contaminated waters Rhodotorula were found to be common in contaminated sites. It was noted in samples taken from contaminated waters that Rhodotorula species had the ability to degrade petroleum compounds. These studies as well as others suggest that Rhodotorula species may be good candidates for bioremediation of polluted waters for PAHs. In more directed studies a number of species of Rhodotorula were found to be able to degrade a number of specific contaminants. For example, R. glutinis and R. rubra have both been found to have a high ability to degrade phenanthrene, while R. minuta has been found to degrade benzo(a)anthracene. In a mixed fungal community Rhodotorula species contributed to effective degradation of low molecular weight PAHs, and although bacterial communities alone were not able to, the fungal communities also degraded high molecular weight PAHs (more than 3 benzene rings) such as chrysene and benzo(a)pyrene. A strain of R. taiwanensis was shown to grow at constant gamma radiation 66 Gy/h at pH 2.3 and in the presence of high concentrations of mercury and chromium compounds, and forming biofilms under high-level chronic radiation and low pH, making it a promising candidate for bioremediation of acidic radioactive waste sites.

Species

Rhodotorula acheniorum
Rhodotorula acuta
Rhodotorula araucariae
Rhodotorula armeniaca
Rhodotorula aurantiaca
Rhodotorula auriculariae
Rhodotorula bacarum
Rhodotorula benthica
Rhodotorula biourgei
Rhodotorula bogoriensis
Rhodotorula bronchialis
Rhodotorula buffonii
Rhodotorula calyptogenae
Rhodotorula cladiensis
Rhodotorula cresolica
Rhodotorula crocea
Rhodotorula cycloclastica
Rhodotorula dairenensis
Rhodotorula evergladiensis
Rhodotorula ferulica
Rhodotorula foliorum
Rhodotorula fragaria
Rhodotorula fujisanensis
Rhodotorula futronensis
Rhodotorula gelatinosa
Rhodotorula glacialis
Rhodotorula glutinis
Rhodotorula gracilis
Rhodotorula graminis
Rhodotorula grinbergsii
Rhodotorula himalayensis
Rhodotorula hinnulea
Rhodotorula histolytica
Rhodotorula hylophila
Rhodotorula incarnata
Rhodotorula ingeniosa
Rhodotorula javanica
Rhodotorula koishikawensis
Rhodotorula lactosa
Rhodotorula lamellibrachiae
Rhodotorula laryngis
Rhodotorula lignophila
Rhodotorula lini
Rhodotorula longissima
Rhodotorula ludwigii
Rhodotorula lysinophila
Rhodotorula marina
Rhodotorula matritensis
Rhodotorula meli
Rhodotorula minuta
Rhodotorula mucilaginosa
Rhodotorula nitens
Rhodotorula nothofagi
Rhodotorula oryzae
Rhodotorula pacifica
Rhodotorula pallida
Rhodotorula philyla
Rhodotorula pilimanae
Rhodotorula pinicola
Rhodotorula psychrophenolica
Rhodotorula psychrophila
Rhodotorula pustula
Rhodotorula retinophila
Rhodotorula rosulata
Rhodotorula rubra
Rhodotorula rubrorugosa
Rhodotorula silvestris
Rhodotorula sinensis
Rhodotorula slooffiae
Rhodotorula sonckii
Rhodotorula straminea
Rhodotorula subericola
Rhodotorula terpenoidalis
Rhodotorula terrea
Rhodotorula tokyoensis
Rhodotorula ulzamae
Rhodotorula vanillica
Rhodotorula vuilleminii
Rhodotorula yarrowii
Rhodotorula yunnanensis
Rhodotorula zsoltii

References

External links 
Rhodotorula at the Dr. Fungus Website

Basidiomycota genera
Teliomycotina
Yeasts